A. N. Upadhyay is a former Director General of Police of Chhattisgarh.

References 

Three-star officers
Indian police officers